"God! Show Me Magic" is the second single by Super Furry Animals. It reached #33 on the UK Singles Chart on its release in April 1996, the first single by the band to reach the Top 40.

The packaging of the single features a quote in Welsh, 'Gorau chwarae, cyd chwarae', which roughly translates into English as 'It is better to play together', the motto of the Football Association of Wales.

The first version of "God! Show Me Magic" appears on the Moog Droog E.P., released on the Ankst label.

Critical response

Accolades

Track listing

All songs by Super Furry Animals.

"God! Show Me Magic" – 1:49
"Death by Melody" – 2:32
"Dim Bendith" – 4:56

Personnel
Gruff Rhys – vocals, guitar
Huw Bunford – guitar
Guto Pryce – bass guitar
Cian Ciaran – keyboards
Dafydd Ieuan – drums
Jez Francis- piano

Singles chart positions

References

Super Furry Animals songs
Creation Records singles
1996 singles
1996 songs